The Roman Catholic Diocese of Granada en Colombia is a diocese located in the city of Granada in the Ecclesiastical province of Villavicencio in Colombia.

History
16 January 1964: Established as Apostolic Prefecture of Ariari from the Apostolic Vicariate of Villavicencio
3 October 1987: Promoted as Apostolic Vicariate of Ariari
29 October 1999: Promoted as Diocese of Granada

Ordinaries
 Prefects Apostolic of Ariari (Roman rite) 
 Bishop Jesús María Coronado Caro, S.D.B. (1964.01.16 – 1973.02.10), appointed Bishop of Girardot
 Bishop Héctor Jaramillo Duque, S.D.B. (1973.09.14 – 1981.08.03), appointed Bishop of Sincelejo
 Fr. Luís Carlos Riveros Lavado, S.D.B. (1982.03.05 – 1986.09.27)
 Vicar Apostolic of Ariari (Roman rite) 
 Bishop Héctor Julio López Hurtado, S.D.B. (1987.12.15 – 1999.10.29)
 Bishops of Granada en Colombia (Roman rite)
 Bishop Héctor Julio López Hurtado, S.D.B. (1999.10.29 – 2001.06.15), appointed Bishop of Girardot
 Bishop José Figueroa Gómez (2002.08.08 – present)

See also
Roman Catholicism in Colombia

Sources

External links
 GCatholic.org

Roman Catholic dioceses in Colombia
Roman Catholic Ecclesiastical Province of Villavicencio
Christian organizations established in 1964
Roman Catholic dioceses and prelatures established in the 20th century